Trepobates polhemi is a species of water strider in the family Gerridae. It is found in Mexico from southern Sonora to Guerrero.

References

Trepobatinae
Insects described in 1982